Constitutional Assembly elections were held in Ecuador on 30 November 1997. They followed a referendum earlier in the year, in which 65% of voters voted in favour of electing an Assembly. The referendum was held after a military coup on 5 February.

The Socialist Party emerged as the largest faction in the Assembly, winning 20 of the 70 seats.

Results

References

Elections in Ecuador
1997 in Ecuador
Ecuador
Election and referendum articles with incomplete results